Joseph S. Douse (April 30, 1930 – August 10, 2012) was a pitcher for the Kansas City Monarchs of the Negro American League in 1952 and 1953.

Born in Atlanta, Georgia, Douse attended Booker T. Washington High School.

According to his recollections, he tossed a one-hitter against the Philadelphia Stars in 1952.

On August 10, 2012, he died in Southfield, Michigan.

References

Kansas City Monarchs players
2012 deaths
1930 births
20th-century African-American sportspeople
21st-century African-American people